Dominik Guláš (born 28 June 1999) is a Slovak footballer who plays for SC Melk as a forward.

Club career

FC Nitra
Guláš made his Fortuna Liga debut for Nitra against AS Trenčín on 18 February 2018. Guláš came on as a replacement for Christián Steinhübel in stoppage time. The game concluded in a 1–1 tie.

References

External links
 FC Nitra official club profile
 
 Futbalnet profile

1999 births
Living people
Sportspeople from Nitra
Slovak footballers
Association football forwards
FC Nitra players
Expatriate footballers in Austria
Slovak Super Liga players